Dungannon is a town in Northern Ireland.

Dungannon may also refer to:

Places

Canada
 Dungannon Township, Hastings County, Ontario - former township

United States
 Dungannon, Columbiana County, Ohio
 Dungannon, Noble County, Ohio
 Dungannon, Virginia

Other
 Dungannon (horse), a thoroughbred racehorse
 Dungannon (barony), a former barony
 "Dungannon" (song), a 1980 song by the band Sector 27